Soochong virus (SOOV) is a zoonotic negative sense single-stranded RNA virus.  It may be a member of the genus Orthohantavirus, but it has not be definitively classified as a species and may only be a strain.  It is one of four rodent-borne Hantaviruses found in the Republic of Korea. It is the etiologic agent for Hantavirus hemorrhagic fever with renal syndrome (HFRS). The other species responsible for HFRS in Korea are Seoul virus, Haantan virus, and Muju virus.

Soochong was isolated from four Korean field mice (Apodemus peninsulae) captured in August 1997 at Mt. Gyebang in Hongcheon-gun, Mt. Gachil, Inje-gun, Gangwon Province, and in September 1998 at Mt. Deogyu, Muju-gun, Jeollabuk Province.

Transmission 
This species of Hantavirus has not been shown to transfer from person-to-person. Transmission by aerosolized rodent excreta still remains the only known way the virus is transmitted to humans. In general, drop-let and/or fomite transfer has not been shown in the hantaviruses in either the hemorrhagic or pulmonary forms.

See also 
 Conjunctival suffusion
 List of cutaneous conditions
 Sweating sickness, which may have been caused by a hantavirus
 1993 Four Corners hantavirus outbreak

References

External links 

Sloan Science and Film / Short Films / Muerto Canyon by Jen Peel 29 minutes
"Hantaviruses, with emphasis on Four Corners Hantavirus" by Brian Hjelle, M.D., Department of Pathology, School of Medicine, University of New Mexico
 CDC's Hantavirus Technical Information Index page
 Viralzone: Hantavirus
 Virus Pathogen Database and Analysis Resource (ViPR): Bunyaviridae
 Occurrences and deaths in North and South America

Viral diseases
Hantaviridae
Hemorrhagic fevers
Rodent-carried diseases
Biological weapons